Then and Now is a series of books published by Salamander Books, a subsidiary of Pavilion Books. In the United States, Thunder Bay Press publishes some books of the series as well.

The series began in the 1960s under the imprint of B. T. Batsford Ltd. and now covers historical photographic collections compared with contemporary photographs across the world.

Series list
The Pavilion Books 'Then and Now' included in the series for the United Kingdom and Australia: –

United Kingdom
 Birmingham
 London
 Manchester

Australia
 Brisbane
 Melbourne
 Perth
 Sydney

Books are also published by Thunder Bay Press for the United States.

United States
 New England
 Boston
 New York City
 Central Park (Manhattan)
 Brooklyn
 Atlantic City
 New Jersey
 Philadelphia
 Pittsburgh
 Baltimore
 Washington, DC
 Charlotte
 Charleston
 Atlanta
 Savannah
 Birmingham
 Orlando
 Miami
 Cleveland
 Columbus (and Ohio State University)
 Detroit
 Indianapolis
 Chicago
 Chicago from the air
 Milwaukee
 Minneapolis/St. Paul
 St. Louis
 Kansas City
 Nashville
 Memphis
 New Orleans
 Dallas
 Austin
 Houston
 San Antonio
 Denver
 Albuquerque
 Phoenix
 Salt Lake City
 Las Vegas
 Seattle
 Portland
 San Francisco
 East Bay
 Los Angeles
 Los Angeles from the air
 Hollywood
 Orange County
 San Diego
 Honolulu
 Alaska
 San Juan
 Puerto Rico
 Ballparks
 New York Yankees
 Civil War Battlefields

Canada
 Montreal
 Vancouver

Caribbean
 Havana

Europe
 Berlin, Germany
 Prague, Czechia
 Paris, France
 Rome, Italy
 Barcelona

Asia
 Beijing, China

Notes

Series of books
Books about Australian history
Books about the United Kingdom